Abdulwahab Al-Hamwi (born June 15, 1990, in Homs) is a Syrian professional basketball player. He plays for Al-Ittihad SC of the Syrian Basketball League. He is also a member of the Syrian national basketball team.

Career 

|-
| style="text-align:left;"| 2009 FIBA Championship Under-19
| style="text-align:left;"| Syrian team U19
| 5 ||  || 15.6 || .409 || .0 || .0 || .460 || .060 || .060 || .100 || .306

References

External links 
 Abdulwahab Al-Hamwi at RealGM
 Player profile on Wuhan2011.FIBAAsia.net

1990 births
Living people
Syrian men's basketball players
Centers (basketball)
Basketball players at the 2018 Asian Games
Asian Games competitors for Syria
Sportspeople from Homs